Protein kinase C and casein kinase substrate in neurons protein 3 is an enzyme that in humans is encoded by the PACSIN3 gene.

Interactions
PACSIN3 has been shown to interact with PACSIN1 and PACSIN2.

References

Further reading